The following highways are numbered 867:

United States